Taiyuan University of Science and Technology is a university in Shanxi, People's Republic of China under the authority of the provincial government.   It is located in the capital city of Shanxi Province, Taiyuan, a historical and cultural city.

Taiyuan University of Science and Technology (TYUST) is a comprehensive university with distinct characteristics and splendid traditions. It has been one of the major bases for training the technical personnel and scientific research in the field of heavy technological equipment manufacture in China.

Administration
The university is structured into the following schools.
School of Mechanical and Electronic Engineering
School of Material Science and Engineering
School of Applied Science
School of Electronic Information Engineering
School of Economy and Management
School of Computer Science and Technology
School of Law
School of Humanities and Social Science
School of Foreign Languages
School of Arts
School Physical Education
School of Adult Education
Huake College

References

External links 
Taiyuan University of Science and Technology

Universities and colleges in Shanxi